Leman Çıdamlı (1 January 1932 – 18 December 2012) was a Turkish television, stage and film actress mostly known for her role as "Nuriye Kantar" on the 1980s-aired Kaynanalar TV series and its remakes. She is the mother of actress Ayşegül Çıdamlı.

Death
She was diagnosed with lung cancer and was treated for six months. She died on 18 December 2012, aged 80. Her spouse had died ten days before. She was interred next to her husband's grave.

Filmography
Aşk Oyunu (2005)
Sen Ne Dilersen (2005)
Cennet Mahallesi (2004) - Suna
Büyükannenin Konağı (2003) - Grandmother
Şöhretler Kebapçısı (2003)
Bedel (2000) - Meryem
Yasemince (1997) - Zehra
Gülşen Abi (1994) - Naciye
Nasreddin Hoca (1993)
Çılgın Aşıklar (1993)
Mahallenin Muhtarları (1992) - Seher
Varyemez  (1991) - Melek
Zehir Hafiye (1989) - Aunt of Zeynep
Bıçkın (1988) - Grandmother of Osman
Kaynanalar (1988) - Nuriye Kantar
Aşkın Gözü Kördür (1987)
Perihan Abla (1986)
Kahkaha Marketi (1986) - Middleman Cemile
Bizim Kız (1977) - voice of Toto Karaca
Bülbül Ailesi (1976) - Asiye
Kaynanalar (1975) - Nuriye Kantar
Nöri Gantar Ailesi (1975) - Nuriye Kantar
Kanlı Deniz (1974) - wife of Tonyalı
Köyden İndim Şehire (1974) - wife of Ali Rıza
Kaynanalar (1974) - Nuriye Kantar

References

External links
 SinemaTürk page
 

1932 births
2012 deaths
Turkish stage actresses
Turkish television actresses
Turkish film actresses
Deaths from lung cancer in Turkey